Chingiz Akhmarov (Uzbek: Чингиз Ахмаров: 1912–1995) was an Uzbek painter and Uzbekistan State Prize laureate.

Akhmarov participated in decoration projects for Moscow's and Tashkent's subway stations and many museums across the Soviet Union.

Early life
Chingiz Akhmarov was born in Troitsk in 1912. His family left Troitsk for Karshi in 1931, from where they moved again to Samarkand. Akhmarov enrolled in the Surikov Art Institute in Moscow in 1935. The institute was relocated to Samarkand during the war, and Akhmarov graduated from there in 1942.

Beginning 1944, Akhmarov launched into an artist's life. Between 1944 and 1947, he painted murals in the Alisher Navoi Theater in Tashkent. This body of work resulted in a state award. An invitation came from Moscow in 1952 to work on creating the 'Friendship of Peoples' mosaic in Kievskaya-koltsevaya metro station. Akhmarov was conferred with the title of People's Artist of Uzbekistan in 1964. in 2001, he was posthumously awarded the 'Buyuk xizmatlari uchun', an Uzbeki medal for outstanding service to the country.

Akhmarov was an artist with a global appeal. His works adorn museums and private collections across the world.

References

1912 births
1995 deaths
20th-century Uzbekistani painters
Soviet painters